Ariel Santana Céspedes (born 21 January 1988) is a Costa Rican professional footballer  who plays as a striker for Belén.

Club career
Santana started his career at Universidad, then played for Saprissa and had a loan spell at Colombian side Deportivo Pereira, before moving to Ramonense in January 2010 and then Puntarenas in summer 2010.

Personal life
Ariel is a son of Carlos Santana, who played for Costa Rica during the 1984 Summer Olympics.

References

External links
 2011-12 career stats - Nación

1988 births
Living people
Footballers from San José, Costa Rica
Association football forwards
Costa Rican footballers
Costa Rica under-20 international footballers
Liga FPD players
Categoría Primera A players
C.F. Universidad de Costa Rica footballers
Deportivo Saprissa players
Deportivo Pereira footballers
A.D. Ramonense players
Puntarenas F.C. players
Belén F.C. players
Ariel Santana
Costa Rican expatriate footballers
Expatriate footballers in Colombia